Col. Henry Lee II (1730–1787) of Alexandria, Westmoreland, Virginia Colony, was an American planter, soldier, and politician, the father of Henry "Light-Horse Harry" Lee III, and grandfather of Robert E. Lee.

Early life 
Lee was the third son of Capt. Henry Lee I (1691–1747) of "Lee Hall", Westmoreland County, and his wife, Mary Bland (1704–1764), the daughter of Hon. Richard Bland, Sr. (1665–1720) and his second wife, Elizabeth Randolph (1685–1719).

Lee was born at "Lee Hall" in 1729, settled in Prince William County, living at "Leesylvania", near the town of Dumfries.  He served as a justice of the peace in that county and first in commission.  In addition he was elected to the Virginia House of Burgesses in 1758, where he served on and off until 1772.  He was a member of the Virginia Convention from 1774-1776.  Lee served as County Lieutenant for Prince William, and was active in the duties of that office during the Revolution.  Henry Lee II also served as a member of the State Senate in 1780. Henry's will was dated August 10, 1787, and was probated in Prince William County on October 1 of the same year.

Family and marriage
Lee was the third son of Capt. Henry Lee I (1691–1747) of "Lee Hall", Westmoreland County, and his wife, Mary Bland (1704–1764). Bland was the daughter of Hon. Richard Bland (1665–1720) and his second wife, Elizabeth Randolph (1685–1719). Randolph was the daughter of William Randolph.

Lee married Lucy Grymes (1734–1792), the daughter of Hon. Charles Grymes (1693–1743) (twice related to President George Washington) and Frances Jennings (great-aunt of Edmund Randolph).  Her father Charles Grymes lived at his "Morattico" plantation, in Richmond County, Virginia. Among Grymes's public offices were was sheriff of Richmond County, and a member of the Governor's Council from 1724-1725.

"Leesylvania" was located between Neabsco Creek and Powell Creek in what became Prince William County, Virginia in his lifetime. Known for its magnificent view up the Potomac River, it contains his and his wife's graves, but the plantation home burned in 1790. It may now be known as the ancestral home of his grandson Robert E. Lee.  Henry Fairfax bought the property in 1825, and his family lived there in a home which may have pre-dated the Lee residence.  The Fairfax home burned in 1910 and the ruins of the walls and a chimney are all that remain.

Children
All of Henry Lee II and Lucy Grymes Lee's children were born at Leesylvania:
 Maj. Gen. Henry Lee III "Light Horse Harry" (1756–1818), Governor of Virginia. Lee III married:
 Matilda Lee (1766–1790), daughter of Hon. Philip Ludwell Lee, Sr., Esq. (1727–1775) and Elizabeth Steptoe (1743–1789), who married secondly, Philip Richard Fendall I, Esq. (1734–1805).
 Anne Hill Carter (1773–1829), daughter of Hon. Charles Carter, Sr. (1737–1802) of "Shirley", and his second wife, Anne Butler Moore (1756). Their son was Confederate General Robert E. Lee.
 Hon. Charles Lee (1758–1815), U.S. Attorney General. Charles married:
 Anne Lee (1770–1804), daughter of Richard Henry Lee (1732–1794) and his second wife, Anne (Gaskins) Pinckard.
 Margaret Christian (Scott) Peyton (1783–1843), widow of Yelverton Peyton (1771–1802).  Margaret was the daughter of Rev. John Scott (1747–1785) and Elizabeth Gordon .
 Richard Bland Lee I (1761–1827) of "Sully", who married Elizabeth "Eliza" Collins (1768–1858), daughter of Stephen Collins and Mary Parish.
 Mary "Mollie" Lee (1764–1827), who married Philip Richard Fendall I, Esq. (1734–1805), his third wife.  Philip was the son of Benjamin Fendall, Esq. (1708–1764) and his first wife, Eleanor Lee (1710–1759).
 Theodorick Lee (1766–1849) of "Eckington", who married Catherine Hite (1766–1849).
 Edmund Jennings Lee I (1772–1843), who married Sally Lee (1775–1837), daughter of Richard Henry Lee (1732–1794) and Anne (Gaskins) Pinckard.
 Lucy Lee (1774), who never married.
 Anne Lee (1776–1857), who married William Byrd Page, Sr. (1768–1812), son of Mann Page (1742–1787) and Mary Mason Selden (1754–1787).

References

House of Burgesses members
Henry
People of Virginia in the American Revolution
1730 births
1787 deaths
American people of English descent
American planters
Bland family of Virginia
Randolph family of Virginia
People from Westmoreland County, Virginia
Virginia colonial people
18th-century American politicians